The Cornwall Colts are a Canadian junior ice hockey team from Cornwall, Ontario, Canada.  They are a part of the Central Canada Hockey League.  Before 1992, they were known as the Massena Americans, and moved to Cornwall in 1992 when the Cornwall Royals were sold and moved away from the city.

Championship era
The Cornwall Colts quickly became CJHL powerhouses winning Art Bogart Cups in 1995 and 1996. The 1996 final between the Gloucester Rangers was played at the Cornwall Civic Complex. A sold-out crowd watched the Cornwall Colts defeat the Gloucester Rangers 4-3 in game 7. In 1998, the Cornwall Colts were swept 4 games to 0 by their highway 401 rivals Brockville Braves. Cornwall went on to claim the Art Bogart Cup over the Brockville Braves two years later, and went on to defeat the Halifax Oland Exports to win the Fred Page Cup. Despite going win-less at the Royal Bank Cup in Fort McMurray, Alberta, the entire City of Cornwall stood right behind the Colts every step of the way. The Colts would continue their winning ways in 2000-01 as the Colts whitewashed the Ottawa Jr. Senators 7-0 in game 7 at the Si Miller Arena on Water Street. But, suffered a heart-breaking overtime loss to the St. Jerome Panthers in the final game of the Fred Page Cup.

2003 Fred Page Cup
The Cornwall Colts and the City of Cornwall was awarded the Fred Page Cup for 2003. The tournament was originally awarded to the Ottawa Junior Senators, but backed out due to arena trouble and accommodations. The tournament was played in the Cornwall Civic Complex, instead of the SI Millar Arena, because it was too small. The tournament was a success, despite that the Colts bowed out in the semi-finals with a double-overtime loss to the Nepean Raiders.

2008 Royal Bank Cup
In fall 2005, the City of Cornwall and the Cornwall Colts were awarded Canada's most prestigious Junior A hockey tournament for 2008. The runner-up for the tournament were the Pembroke Lumber Kings. For the 2007-08 season, the Cornwall Colts shifted over to the Cornwall Civic Complex and left the Si Miller Arena for good. The Colts now had the biggest arena in the league, despite that attendance figures were surprisingly low. The Colts finished 6th and lost the quarter-finals. The Colts rested for several weeks and entered the tournament with expectations of winning the Royal Bank Cup. But, a 7-0 loss to the Humboldt Broncos of the SJHL in the opening contest wasn't the start they were looking for. The Colts managed to win the next two games against the Oakville Blades (5-4) and Weeks Crushers (6-1), but lost in the semi-finals to the eventual champion Humboldt Broncos.
The Colts did very well. Captain Darcy Findlay received the RBC most valuable player award for the tournament.

Cornwall Civic Complex
The Cornwall Civic Complex became the permanent home for the Cornwall Colts in 2007. Before, the Colts played their games at the now-demolished SI Miller Arena. The Cornwall Colts played their games at the Cornwall Civic Complex since 1992, but moved into the SI Miller in 1997. The Cornwall Civic Complex was used to host the 2003 and 2015 Fred Page Cup tournaments.

Season-by-season record
Note: GP = Games Played, W = Wins, L = Losses, T = Ties, OTL = Overtime Losses, GF = Goals for, GA = Goals against

Fred Page Cup 
Eastern Canada Championships
MHL - QAAAJHL - CCHL - Host
Round robin play with 2nd vs 3rd in semi-final to advance against 1st in the finals.

 * 2003 Tournament Host

Royal Bank Cup
CANADIAN NATIONAL CHAMPIONSHIPS
Dudley Hewitt Champions - Central, Fred Page Champions - Eastern, Western Canada Cup Champions - Western, Western Canada Cup - Runners Up and Host
Round robin play with top 4 in semi-final and winners to finals.

Championships
CJHL Bogart Cup Championships: 1995, 1996, 2000, 2001, 2013
Eastern Canadian Fred Page Cup Championships: 2000
CJAHL Royal Bank Cup Championships: None

Notable alumni
Doug Lawson
Cam Barker
Andre Binette
Yann Danis
Farrand Gillie
Rosario Joannette
Chad Kilger
Frank Mario
Kent McDonell
Eric Meloche
Kevin O'Shea
Gordon Spence
Ryan VandenBussche
Ron Ward
Jesse Winchester (ice hockey)
  Brian Marino
Alain Quenneville

External links
Cornwall Colts Webpage

Central Canada Hockey League teams
Sport in Cornwall, Ontario
Ice hockey clubs established in 1988